Donald Ellis Wildmon (born January 18, 1938) is an ordained United Methodist minister, author, former radio host, and founder and chairman emeritus of the American Family Association and American Family Radio.

Life and career

Wildmon was born in the Ripley, Mississippi, the son of Johnnie Bernice (née Tigrett), a schoolteacher, and Ellis Clifton Wildmon, a civil servant. Wildmon graduated from Millsaps College in 1960. In 1961, he married Lynda Lou Bennett, with whom he has two sons and two daughters. From 1961 to 1963, he served in the U.S. Army. He gained his Master of Divinity (M.Div.) from Emory University's Candler School of Theology in 1965.

In June 1977, he moved to Tupelo, Mississippi, to establish the National Federation for Decency (NFD), the predecessor to the modern American Family Association, because after watching television one night in December 1976 he felt that no primetime television program was appropriate for his family with young children. With a membership of 1,400, NFD's first television advertiser boycott was during spring 1978 and against Sears for sponsoring All in the Family, Charlie's Angels, and Three's Company. Sears withdrew sponsorship of the latter two programs.

In February 1980, Wildmon founded the Coalition for Better Television (CBTV), this time with the help of Jerry Falwell and claiming a nationwide membership of 5 million. However, CBTV disbanded and Wildmon started Christian Leaders for Responsible Television without Falwell's involvement.

In 1986, the owners of the 7-Eleven convenience store chain pulled adult magazines from its stores after a boycott by the NFD.

Campaign for Decency
Throughout the late 1970s, Wildmon actively protested television series that he thought promoted immoral lifestyles. He spoke against such programs as Three's Company, M*A*S*H and Dallas.

Damned in the U.S.A. 
In 1991, the British television documentary Damned in the U.S.A., made for Channel 4's Without Walls arts series and directed by Paul Yule, about the then current state of censorship in the United States, chronicled the battle between Wildmon and artists Andres Serrano and Robert Mapplethorpe. The documentary won the International Emmy for Best Documentary, amongst several other awards. Wildmon sued the producers for $8 million in damages after a distributor got the rights to show the film in the United States, stating that he had signed a contract with the producers that prevented distribution in the USA. A federal court found that Wildmon's contract did not support his claim concerning distribution of the film and the documentary was released in 50 cities nationwide.

Illness and retirement 
On August 18, 2009, Tim Wildmon released the news via email that his father had been admitted to the North Mississippi Medical Center in Tupelo over the weekend of August 15–16, with what was thought to be a serious case of meningitis. After running tests, however, doctors determined that he had St. Louis encephalitis, a disease usually contracted from mosquitoes. He spent 121 days in the hospital and rehab, and later underwent surgery for cancer on his left eye. On March 3, 2010, it was announced that Wildmon was stepping down as chairman of the American Family Association. His son Tim was expected to become the new chairman.

Publications 
 Wildmon, Donald E. (1975) Stand up to Life. Abingdon. 
 Wildmon, D. (1985) Home Invaders. David C. Cook. 
 Wildmon, D. (1986) The Case Against Pornography. David C. Cook. 
 Wildmon, D. (and Randall Nulton; 1989) Don Wildmon: The Man the Networks Love to Hate. Bristol. 
 Wildmon, D. (1997) Following the Carpenter: Parables to Inspire Obedience in the Christian Life. Thomas Nelson. 
 Wildmon, D. (2009) Speechless: Silencing the Christians: How Secular Liberals and Homosexual Activists are Outlawing Christianity (and Judaism) to Force Their Sexual Agenda on America. Richard Vigilante. 
 Friedeman, Matt. Wildmon, Donald E. (2001) In the Fight: A Mississippi Conservative Swings Back. Well Writers' Guild.

See also 
 Christian right
 Culture war
 Speechless: Silencing the Christians
 Mary Whitehouse, seen as the British equivalent to Wildmon.

References

External links 
 Don Wildmon's biography on the American Family Association website

1938 births
20th-century Methodist ministers
21st-century Methodist ministers
American evangelicals
American nonprofit executives
American radio executives
American talk radio hosts
Anti-pornography activists
Candler School of Theology alumni
Living people
Methodist writers
People from Tippah County, Mississippi
United States Army soldiers
Writers from Mississippi
American Family Association
American Methodist clergy
Activists from Mississippi